Michel-Olivier Martelly, better known as Olivier Martelly, is a Haitian American singer. He has a stage name, BigO.

Early life
Olivier Martelly was born in Miami. His father, Michel Martelly was the 41st President of Haiti, and his mother, Sophia Saint-Rémy Martelly, was First Lady.

Career
Martelly's discographies are hard to find, and as public data about him is extremely limited, his career is relatively unknown. In Haiti's 2015 presidential election, he published a song endorsing government-backed candidate Jovenel Moise in response to Wyclef Jean's endorsement of Jude Célestin. Martelly is the CEO of Big O Productions, which features Haitian artists.

References

Haitian artists
Haitian businesspeople
Year of birth missing (living people)
Living people
Children of national leaders
Musicians from Miami